William Herbert Crook (April 18, 1925 – October 29, 1997) was an American preacher turned politician, national director of the Volunteers in Service to America (VISTA) program and US Ambassador to Australia.

William Herbert Crook was born in Momence, Illinois on April 18, 1925.

In 1954, Crook married Eleanor Butt, daughter of Howard Edward Butt Sr., the founder of the H-E-B grocery store chain. They had three children, William Crook Jr., Elizabeth Crook, and Noel Moore. He died on October 29, 1997, at the age of 72.

References

1925 births
1997 deaths
People from Momence, Illinois
Butt family
Ambassadors of the United States to Australia
Volunteers in Service to America administrators